Cactus Plain is a plain east of the Colorado River and Parker Valley, in La Paz County, western Arizona, United States.

Geography
Cactus Plain is a landform within the Lower Colorado River Valley. It is adjacent to Bouse Wash, which is on the south. The wash drains northwest-west into the Colorado River.

Protected areas
Recreation activities in both protected areas includes backpacking, day hiking, sightseeing, horseback riding, photography, and botanical and wildlife study.

Cactus Plain Wilderness Study Area
The  Cactus Plain Wilderness Study Area protects the western two-thirds of the Cactus Plain, managed by the Bureau of Land Management (BLM).

The wilderness study area is an immense open area of stabilized and semi-stabilized sand dunes, unique in western Arizona.  Recreation activities include backpacking, day hiking, sightseeing, horseback riding, and botanical and wildlife study.

East Cactus Plain Wilderness
The  East Cactus Plain Wilderness area protects the eastern third of the Cactus Plain, managed by the BLM.

It is predominantly a complex crescent dune, with dense dune–scrub vegetation, known only from this area in Arizona. The plant community is unique in its denseness and flora species diversity.

See also
 List of LCRV Wilderness Areas (Colorado River)
 Protected areas of La Paz County, Arizona

References

External links

 Bureau of Land Management – BLM: Cactus Plain Wilderness Study Area
 Wilderness.net: East Cactus Plain Wilderness

Plains of Arizona
Landforms of La Paz County, Arizona
Bureau of Land Management areas in Arizona
Protected areas of La Paz County, Arizona
Lower Colorado River Valley